The MTV Europe Music Award for MTV Select was created in 1996. The five nominations in this category was selected by the viewers during a special MTV Select Weekend, a nine-hour marathon. Europe's favourite 100 videos were compiled and then were reduced, by viewer votes, to the five nominations for The MTV Europe Music Awards Select category. In 1998 the category was divided into four; MTV Select UK and Ireland, MTV Select Northern, MTV Select Central and MTV Select Southern.

1990s

References

MTV Europe Music Awards
Awards established in 1996